Hurricane Tyra Black (born March 2, 2001) is an American professional tennis player. She is the sister of Tornado Alicia Black.

Early life
Tyra Hurricane Black and Alicia "Tornado" Black are the children of Sylvester Black, who played for the Jamaican Davis Cup team, and Gayal Black. At the age of 3, Black was nicknamed "Hurricane" because her parents attempted to make them more marketable as professional tennis players.

Career
She was coached in tennis by Rick Macci.

In 2016, Black suffered a hip injury.

Despite this her only career title on the ITF Women's Tour came on the clay in Antalya, Turkey. She won the doubles tournament alongside Swiss tennis player Svenja Ochsner, in December 2020. During the third set of the quarterfinal, against the Turkish/Croatian duo of Cemre Anil and Ena Kajevica, the tie-break went beyond the normal ten points, with Black and Ochsner winning 11–9. At the final, the pair defeated Gergana Topalova and Daniela Vismane, by a scoreline of 7–6, 7–5. This was Black's first ITF title, winning $478 in prize money.

In 2022, Black, she won two $15k professional singles titles within a span of three weeks, both in Antalya, Turkey.

ITF finals

Singles: 7 (5 titles, 2 runner–ups)

Doubles: 4 (2 titles, 2 runner-ups)

References

External links
 
 

2001 births
Living people
American female tennis players
African-American female tennis players
21st-century African-American sportspeople
21st-century African-American women